Rajaratnam is a South Indian and Sri Lankan male given name. Due to the South Indian tradition of using patronymic surnames it may also be a surname for males and females.

Notable people

Given name
 D. Rajarathinam, Indian politician
 F. M. Rajarathnam, Indian politician
 G. P. Rajarathnam (1909–1979), Indian writer and poet
 J. M. Rajaratnam (1927–2014), Sri Lankan accountant and corporate executive
 S. Rajaratnam (1884–1970), Ceylonese lawyer and politician
 S. Rajaratnam (1915–2006), Singaporean politician
 T. N. Rajarathinam Pillai (1898–1956), Indian musician

Surname
 Raj Rajaratnam (born 1957), American banker convicted of insider trading
 Rajaratnam Kumaravadivel, Sri Lankan physicist and academic
 Rengan Rajaratnam (born 1971), American banker
 T. W. Rajaratnam (1920–1994), Sri Lankan lawyer, judge and politician
 Thenmozhi Rajaratnam (died 1991), assassin

See also
 
 
 

Tamil masculine given names